Karina /kəˈriːnə/ is a female given name of modern usage. It can be a variant spelling of Carina (from Latin carus = love) or a short form of Katarina/Katrina, which in turn are variants of Katherine.

People with the given name
Anna Karina (1940–2019), Danish-French actress
Karina, or Elda Neyis Mosquera (born 1963), Colombian guerrilla commander
Karina (Spanish singer) (born 1946)
Karina (Venezuelan singer) (born 1968)
Karina Adsbøl (born 1976), Danish politician
Karina Ambartsumova (born 1989), Russian chess player
Karina Beteta (born 1975), Peruvian politician
Karina Bisson (born 1966), Jersey bowler
Karina Bryant (born 1979), British judoka
Karina Christensen (born 1973), Danish footballer
Karina Gauvin (born 1966), Canadian soprano
Karina González (born 1991), Mexican model and beauty pageant
Karina Gould (born 1987), Canadian politician
Karina Habšudová (born 1973), Slovak tennis player
Karina Jäger-von Stülpnagel, German ballerina
Karina Jett, American poker player
Karina Jørgensen (born 1988), Indian-born Danish badminton player
Karina Krause (born 1989), Thai volleyball player
Karina Lombard (born 1969), American actress
Karina Maruyama (born 1983), Japanese football player
Karina Moya (born 1973), Argentine hammer thrower
Karina Nadila, Miss Supranational Indonesia 2017
Karina Nose (born 1984), Japanese model and actress
Karina Ocasio (born 1985), Puerto Rican volleyball player
Karina Pasian (born 1991), American singer and pianist
Karina Penetito (born 1986), New Zealand rugby union player
Karina Pētersone (born 1954), Latvian politician
Karina Smirnoff (born 1978), Ukrainian dancer
Karina Sørensen (born 1980), Danish badminton player
Karina Sumner-Smith, Canadian writer
Karina Ramos (born 1993), Costa Rican television host, model and beauty pageant
Karina Vetrano (1986–2016), American speech-language pathologist and murder victim
Karina Vnukova (born 1985), Lithuanian high jumper
Karina Winter (born 1986), German athlete

See also

Carina (disambiguation), a homonym of Karina
Kareena, a homophone of Karina
Karlina
Karine

References 

Given names
Feminine given names